St.Mary's Anglican Church, a church in the Diocese of Christ the King, built at the beginning of the twentieth century, but before 1907 is one of the first churches built in Rosettenville, Johannesburg. The church was built with a quarried natural stone which was provided by Leo Rosettenstein, the township owner after whom Rosettenville was named. The building was designed by the firm of Baker and Fleming. The churchwardens continue to take good care of the building and it remains in pristine condition.

References

Anglican church buildings in South Africa
Buildings and structures in Johannesburg
Churches in Johannesburg
Herbert Baker buildings and structures